Dammam Metro is a proposed metro rail system for the Dammam metropolitan area in the Eastern Province of Saudi Arabia. The project is estimated to cost SAR 60 billion (US$ 16 billion), and was originally expected to be completed by 2021.

History
An integrated public transport system for Dammam was approved by the Council of Ministers on 19 May 2014, and publicly announced by Eastern Province Mayor Fahad Al Jubair on 21 May 2014. The project includes 50 km of light rail, 110 km of bus rapid transit, and 350 km of feeder buses to link the outskirts of the city. The Council also approved the establishment of a private company to monitor the implementation of the project.

The light rail system will have two lines. The first line will link Tarout Island with King Fahd Causeway via Qatif, Dammam and Dhahran. The second line will connect King Fahd Road in Dammam to the King Fahd International Airport. Studies to finalize the alignment and location of the stations will take an estimated 18 months.

At the Middle East Rail 2017 conference and exhibition in Dubai on 7 March 2017, President of the Public Transport Authority Rumaih Al Rumaih stated that the Dammam Metro project would be developed as a public private partnership.

References

Rapid transit in Saudi Arabia
Transport in Dammam
Proposed rapid transit
Proposed rail infrastructure in Saudi Arabia